Warner Christian Academy (WCA) is a private Christian school located at 1730 South Ridgewood Ave. in South Daytona, Florida and was founded in September 1972. It is a ministry of White Chapel Church of God.

Background 
Warner Christian Academy, a ministry of White Chapel Church of God, opened the doors of the first grade in September 1971 and soon after added a Day Care Center. In September 1972 WCA opened the school year with 228 students in grades K5-9. By the 1973 fall term, Warner had 440 students and the athletic program was started.

Academics 
Warner Christian Academy is accredited by the Association of Christian Schools International (ACSI).  ACSI is a charter member of the National Council for Private School Accreditation (NCPSA), and the accreditation program of ACSI has been fully recognized by them.

References

External links
 www.wcaeagles.org -- WCA Homepage
 www.whitechapelchurch.com -- White Chapel Church Website

Christian schools in Florida
Nondenominational Christian schools in the United States
High schools in Volusia County, Florida
Private high schools in Florida
Private middle schools in Florida
Private elementary schools in Florida